Samuel McGregor Taylor (23 September 1933 – 6 November 2013) was a Scottish professional footballer who played as a winger

Career
Born in Glasgow, Taylor played for Dunipace, Falkirk, Preston North End, Carlisle United, Southport and Morecambe.

Later life and death
Taylor died on 6 November 2013 at the age of 80.

References

1933 births
2013 deaths
Scottish footballers
Dunipace F.C. players
Falkirk F.C. players
Preston North End F.C. players
Carlisle United F.C. players
Southport F.C. players
Morecambe F.C. players
Scottish Football League players
English Football League players
Association football wingers
Footballers from Glasgow
Scottish Junior Football Association players